American rapper Schoolboy Q has released five studio albums, two mixtapes, 30 singles (including 14 as a featured artist), and 36 music videos.

Studio albums

Mixtapes

Singles

As lead artist

As featured artist

Other charted songs

Guest appearances

Music videos

As main artist

As featured artist

See also
Black Hippy discography

Notes

References

External links
 
 
 

Discographies of American artists
Hip hop discographies